Titus of Bostra (died c. 378) was a Christian theologian and bishop. Sozomen names Titus among the great men of the time of Constantius.

Life
Sozomen also tells of a mean trick played upon Titus by Julian the Apostate. It was expected that the reestablishment of paganism would cause riots, as it had elsewhere.  Julian wrote to Titus, as bishop of Bostra (now Bosra) that he would hold him and the clergy responsible for any disorder. Titus replied that though the Christians were equal in number to the pagans they would obey him and keep quiet. Julian then wrote to the Bostrians urging them to expel Titus because he had calumniated them by attributing their quiet conduct not to their own good dispositions but to his influence. Titus remained bishop at Bostra until c. 371.

According to Socrates Titus was one of the bishops who signed the Synodal Letter, addressed to Jovian by the Council of Antioch (363), in which the Nicene Creed was accepted, though with a clause "intended somewhat to weaken and semiarianize the expression homoousios".

Works
St. Jerome names Titus among writers whose secular erudition is as marvellous as their knowledge of Scripture; in his De Viris Illustribus, cii, he speaks of his "mighty" (fortes) books against the Manichaean and nonnulla alia. He places his death under Valens.

Of the nonnulla alia only fragments of exegetical writings have survived. These show that Titus followed the Antiochene School of Scripture exegesis in keeping to the literal as opposed to the allegorical interpretation.

His Contra Manichæos is the most important work of the kind that has come down to us; it is extremely valuable because of the number of quotations it contains from Manichaean writers. The work consists of four books of which the fourth and the greater part of the third are only extant in a Syriac translation. The Greek and Syriac texts of the Contra Manichæos were published by Paul de Lagarde (Berlin, 1859). Earlier editions of the Greek text suffer from an insertion from a work of Serapion owing to the misplacement of a leaf in the original codex. The latest edition by Paul-Huber Poirier of the extant Greek text and the more extensive Syriac translation appeared 2013 (Corpus Christianorum Series Graeca 82). In 2015 a French translation of the texts in this edition appeared in the Corpus Christianorum in Translation-series.

In one passage Titus seems to favour Origen's view that the pains of the damned are not eternal.

A Commentary on the Gospel of St. Luke is attributed to Titus, which survives in excerpts principally in catenae. For this, and other writings attributed to Titus see Migne and Gallandi. The genuine exegetical fragments of this commentary were published by Sickenberger.

Notes

References
 CPG II & Supplementum Clavis Patrum Graecorum 3575 - 3578
 "In addition to the cited sources mentions: "The Greek and Syriac texts of the Contra Manich. were published by LAGARDE (Berlin, 1859). Earlier editions of the Greek text suffer from an insertion from a work of Serapion owing to the misplacement of a leaf in the original codex. For Contra Manich. and other writings attributed to TITUS see MIGNE and GALLANDI. The genuine exegetical fragments of this commentary were published by SICKENBERGER in Texte u. Untersuchen, VI, i (new series). BARDENHEWER-SHARAN, Patrology (St. Louis, 1908), 270-1."

Further reading

 P. G. Walsh, James Walsh, Divine Providence and Human Suffering, Wilmington: Michael Glazer 1985, p. 53 et seq.

External links
Source
CCEL article

4th-century Syrian bishops
Church Fathers
4th-century Christian universalists
378 deaths
Year of birth unknown
4th-century births
Christian universalist theologians